Fiery Firemen is a 1928 silent animated short co-directed by a young Friz Freleng and Rudolph Ising, produced by George Winkler, and stars Oswald the Lucky Rabbit. It is among the few Oswald shorts from the Winkler period known to exist.

Plot
Oswald is a fire fighter who is seen resting in bed inside the fire department. Also lying in bed beside him is his colleague, a horse.

One day, a condo building goes ablaze, and calls for help from the scene are audible miles away. Oswald and his horse are at first reluctant to leave their bed, but still manage to rush toward the site on time.

In their first rescue mission, Oswald scales a building to the floor where stranded mice are waiting. Oswald provides them a long rope which they use to slide down. Next, Oswald and his companion go to another building to rescue a hippo. Inside their targeted room, they find the hippo unconscious and try to carry her out the window. As Oswald starts down the ladder, the hippo awakens. The massive weight of the large animal causes the ladder to collapse and the two occupants plummet down through the sidewalk, leaving a hole. Oswald comes up through a basement door, carrying the hippo single-handedly.

See also
 Oswald the Lucky Rabbit filmography

References

External links
 Of Rocks and Socks: The Winkler Oswalds (1928-29)

1928 films
1928 animated films
1928 short films
1920s American animated films
1920s animated short films
American silent short films
American black-and-white films
Short films directed by Friz Freleng
Films directed by Rudolf Ising
Films about firefighting
Oswald the Lucky Rabbit cartoons
Universal Pictures animated short films
Animated films about animals
Screen Gems short films
Silent American comedy films